Complete Sports is a Nigerian daily national sports newspaper and has its headquarters in Isolo, a local government area in Lagos State. It was first published in 1995 as the flagship newspaper of Complete Communications Limited and has gone on to become one of the most widely read newspaper in Nigeria. The newspaper focuses primarily on Nigerian sports personalities particularly Nigerian footballers.

Complete Sports is circulated around Nigeria and some parts of Benin and Cameroon thus making it one of the most circulated newspaper in West Africa.

See also

 List of Nigerian newspapers

References

External links
 

1995 establishments in Nigeria
Daily newspapers published in Nigeria
English-language newspapers published in Africa
Newspapers established in 1995
Newspapers published in Lagos
Sports mass media in Nigeria
Sports newspapers